Anna Jantar-Kukulska (born Anna Maria Szmeterling; 10 June 1950 – 14 March 1980) was a Polish singer and the mother of singer Natalia Kukulska. She is considered an icon of Polish pop music, and also one of the popular and famous Polish singers of the 1970s.

Early and personal life

Jantar was born in Poznań on 10 June 1950, one of two children born to Józef Szmeterling (1925–1997) and Halina, née Surmacewicz (1924–2016). On 1 July 1950, she was baptized at the Church of Holy Savior in Poznań, receiving the names Anna Maria.

From an early age she showed a talent for singing. For almost three years, she attended a music kindergarten at the State Higher School of Music, where she studied piano. At the age of fourteen, she was invited by Piotr Kuźniak to join the big-beat music group Szafir. She attended Adam Mickiewicz High School in Poznań, from 1965 to 1969 and Secondary Music School in Poznań.

In 1969, she passed the exam at the State Theater School in Warsaw, but was not accepted due to priority given to students from working-class and rural families.

Jantar married Polish composer Jarosław Kukulski (26 May 1944 – 13 September 2010) on 11 April 1971; the couple had one child, a daughter, singer Natalia Kukulska. A widower after Jantar's 1980 death, he remarried after her death to singer Monika Borys, by whom he had a second child, Piotr.

Career

Jantar began her artistic career in 1968 as Anna Szmeterling. Initially, she performed in Poznań student clubs and the Student Theater Nurt in Winogrady, as an accompanist and later also as a vocalist. On 16 December 1968, she collaborated with the band Polne Kwiaty  and recorded the song Po ten serce Czerwony on the Poznań radio. In January 1969, she performed at the Student Song Festival in Kraków, which is prestigious artistic environment, where she received a distinction for her performance.  A year later she became the lead vocalist of the band Waganci. Her best-known song from this period is Co ja w tobie widziałam ("What did I see in you"). Jarosław Kukulski, whom she married on 11 April 1971, was also a member of the group and composed many of her hit songs. The group cooperated with the Czerwono-Czarni band during a joint concert tour. She appeared in the musical comedy Milion za Laurę ("Million for Laura"), which was directed by Hieronim Przybył, while performing the song Czujna straż ("Vigilant Guard") with the band Wagantami. In 1972, she passed the examination before the Verification Commission of the Ministry of Culture and Arts, obtaining the title of a professional singer and assumed the artistic pseudonym: 'Anna Jantar', thus 
beginning her solo career. She performed in a stage program together with singer Andrzej Frajndt with a script provided by Janusz Weiss.

In 1973, she took part in the National Festival of Polish Song in Opole with the song Najtrudniejszy pierwszy krok ("The first step is the hardest"). Later, she launched many other hits, including Staruszek świat ("Old Man World"), Za każdy uśmiech ("For Every Smile"), Tyle słońca w całym mieście ('So Much Sun in the Whole City'), Moje jedyne marzenie ('My Only Dream') and many more, which made her one of the most popular Polish singers of the 1970s. Jantar collaborated with many Polish artists, including with Stanisław Sojka, Bogusław Mec, Zbigniew Hołdys and Andrzej Tenard. She also recorded songs with Budka Suflera and the band Perfect. She performed at concerts in countries such as Austria, Bulgaria, Canada, Czechoslovakia, Finland, East Germany, West Germany, Hungary, Ireland, Soviet Union, Sweden, the United States and Yugoslavia.

In 1979, Jantar was awarded the honorary badge Meritorious Activist of Culture. The last TV program she participated was a children's program titled Zamiast słuchać bajek ("Instead of Listening to Fairy Tales"), which was filmed in Wałbrzych.

Her image was featured on cover pages of Polish magazines.

Death

On 27 December 1979, Jantar flew to the United States. In January and February 1980, she played concerts at the Polish American community clubs in Chicago and New Jersey. On 12 March, she performed her last concert at the Zodiac club in New Jersey. During one of her last performances, she said to the audience:
Good evening, welcome to you very cordially. I greet all the children who have come today (...). Ladies and Gentlemen, hello and, unfortunately, I am sorry to say goodbye. Because I am singing today for the last time (...) for you and I am very happy and at the same time a bit sad about it. I will sing a few songs from my repertoire for you. They will be older, newer ... Of course, there will be some complete novelties. And I'll start with a song that I have a special fondness for, as it reminds me of the beginnings of my stage work. A song with a beautiful title, which can also be a recipe for happiness - Żeby szczęśliwym być ("To be happy").

On 14 March 1980, Jantar was returning to Warsaw from New York by LOT Polish Airlines Flight 007, when the plane crashed near Okęcie Airport in Warsaw due to uncontained engine failure. All the 87 passengers and crew including Jantar were killed in the crash. After her death, the forensic doctor who conducted her autopsy handed over to her mother Halina a rosary, which she was holding in her clenched hand during the crash.

On 25 March, her funeral ceremony took place, with the participation of approximately 40,000 people at Wawrzyszewski Cemetery in Warsaw. Actor Daniel Olbrychski eulogized her at the funeral. When her husband Jarosław Kukulski died on 10 September 2010, he was buried next to her at the Wawrzyszewski Cemetery.

Photo gallery

Awards
 1970 – "Song of the year (1970)" for Co ja w tobie widziałam'
 1974 – National Festival of Polish Song in Opole – People's Choice Award for the song "Tyle słońca w całym mieście"
 1974 – Coupe d'Europe – 3rd place with Marianna Wróblewska and Tadeusz Woźniak for the song Tyle słońca w całym mieście 1975 – Sopot Festival – 2nd place for her performance of the song "Staruszek świat", people's choice award
 1975 – 2nd place for the song Niech ziemia tonie w kwiatach at the Festival of Hit Songs in Dresden
 1975 – Polish "Song of the year (1975)" for Tyle słońca w całym mieście 1975 – Polish "Singer of the year (1975)"
 1976 – Złota Płyta for her album Tyle słońca w całym mieście at the Sopot Festival
 1977 – Złota Płyta for the album "Za każdy uśmiech" 
 1979 – 2nd place for her performance of her song Tylko mnie poproś do tańca ("Just ask me to dance") at the Festival of Hit Songs in Tampere, Finland
 1979 – Polish "Song of the year (1979)" for the song Nic nie może wiecznie trwać ("Nothing lasts forever"), chosen by listeners of the radio station Studia Gama''
 1979 – Polish "Singer of the year (1979)"

Discography

Singles

 1971 – Wszystkie koty w nocy czarne/Marzenia o marzeniaci (Waganci)
 1974 – Nastanie dzień/Tyle słońca w całym mieście nie widziałem tego
 1975 – Staruszek świat/Dzień bez happy endu
 1975 – Będzie dość/Za każdy uśmiech
 1975 – Mój tylko mój/Dzień nadziei
 1977 – Dyskotekowy bal/Zgubiłam klucz do nieba
 1977 – Dyskotekowy bal/Kto umie tęsknić
 1978 – Baju-baj proszę pana (Jambalaya)/Radość najpiękniejszych lat
 1978 – Po tamtej stronie marzeń/Mój świat zawsze ten sam
 1978 – Mój tylko mój/Mój świat zawsze ten sam
 1978 – Kto powie nam/Dżinsowe maniery
 1978 – Tylko mnie poproś do tańca/Let me stay/Nie wierz mi nie ufaj mi/Zawsze gdzieś czeka ktoś
 1979 – Gdzie są dzisiaj tamci ludzie/Nie ma piwa w niebie
 1979 – Hopelessly devoted to you/You're the one that I want (with Stanisław Sojka)
 1985 – Wielka dama tańczy sama/Moje jedyne marzenie
 2005 – Układ z życiem/Nic nie może wiecznie trwać

Albums
 1974 – "Tyle słońca w całym mieście", reedition 2001
 1975 – "Za każdy uśmiech", reedition 2001
 1979 – "Zawsze gdzieś czeka ktoś"
 1980 – "Anna Jantar", reedition 1999

Compilations
 1980 – "The Best Of"
 1986 – "Anna i Natalia" (Anna Jantar, Natalia Kukulska)
 1990 – "Piosenki Anny Jantar" (Anna Jantar i inni artyści)
 1990 – "The Best Of 2"
 1991 – "Piosenki dla dzieci" (Anna Jantar, Natalia Kukulska)
 1991 – "Nic nie może wiecznie trwać"
 1991 – "Wspomnienie"
 1992 – "The collection"
 1992 – "Złote przeboje"
 1996 – "Cygańska jesień"
 1997 – "Antalogia cz.1"
 1997 – "Antalogia cz.2"
 1999 – "Przyjaciele"
 2000 – "Radość najpiękniejszych lat" (Złota kolekcja)
 2000 – "Tyle słońca..." live (Koncert poświęcony pamięci Anny Jantar)
 2003 – "Perły – Tyle słońca w całym mieście"
 2004 – "Platynowa kolekcja – Złote przeboje"
 2004 – "The best – Dyskotekowy bal"
 2005 – "Tyle słońca..." 3 CD
 2005 – "Po tamtej stronie" (Anna Jantar, Natalia Kukulska)
 2010 – "Wielka dama" 4 CD

Memorials

 After the death of Jantar, Polish group Budka Suflera dedicated their song "Słońca jakby mniej" for Jantar.
 Krzysztof Krawczyk dedicated his song "To co dał nam świat" to Jantar.
 Anna Jantar “Burstyn" Music Club was founded by Agata Materowicz and Zbigniew Rostkowski. Shortly that Club had more than 1600 members in Poland.
 In 1984, Agata Materowicz, Zbigniew Rostkowski, and Roman Woszczek organized the exhibition Anna Jantar- First Step- Last Step” at the Students Club „Stodola” – Warsaw. Jarosław Kukulski and Natalia opened the exhibition, and songs were performed by Eleni Tzoka and Halina Frackowiak. The collection included photos, her personal mementos, letters from her Fans, dresses and costumes, awards, long play records etc. From Warsaw, the exhibition moved to Poznań, Łódź and Lublin.
 In Wrzesnia, the local amphitheater is named after Anna Jantar.
 The mural dedicated to Jantar was unveiled in Opole last September 3, 2020 and was made by her daughter Natalia Kukulska.

References

Bibliography

External links

 Official Website of Anna Jantar

1950 births
1980 deaths
Musicians from Poznań
Polish pop singers
20th-century Polish women singers
Victims of aviation accidents or incidents in 1980
Victims of aviation accidents or incidents in Poland
Recipient of the Meritorious Activist of Culture badge